Blackwell is an unincorporated community in the town of Blackwell, Forest County, Wisconsin, United States. The community was named for sawmill owner John Blackwell.

References

Unincorporated communities in Forest County, Wisconsin
Unincorporated communities in Wisconsin